The Othain is a  long river in the Meurthe-et-Moselle and Meuse départements, northeastern France. Its source is at Gondrecourt-Aix, in the Woëvre. It flows generally northwest. It is a left tributary of the Chiers into which it flows between Villécloye and Montmédy.

Communes along its course
This list is ordered from source to mouth: 
Meurthe-et-Moselle: Gondrecourt-Aix, Affléville
Meuse: Dommary-Baroncourt, Domremy-la-Canne, Gouraincourt, Spincourt, Vaudoncourt, Muzeray, Nouillonpont, Duzey, Rouvrois-sur-Othain, Pillon, Sorbey, Saint-Laurent-sur-Othain
Meurthe-et-Moselle: Grand-Failly
Meuse: Rupt-sur-Othain
Meurthe-et-Moselle: Petit-Failly
Meuse: Marville 
Meurthe-et-Moselle: Saint-Jean-lès-Longuyon, Villers-le-Rond
Meuse: Flassigny, Velosnes
Meurthe-et-Moselle: Othe
Meuse: Bazeilles-sur-Othain, Villécloye, Montmédy

References

Rivers of France
Rivers of Meurthe-et-Moselle
Rivers of Meuse (department)
Rivers of Grand Est